Ball Peak is a peak rising to  at the head of Loftus Glacier in the Asgard Range, Victoria Land. It was named by New Zealand Geographic Board (1998) after Gary Ball, a New Zealand Antarctic Division field guide and instructor in survival training at Scott Base, 1976–77; field guide, northern Victoria Land GANOVEX expedition, 1979–80. Gary Ball died in the Himalayas, 1993.

References 

Mountains of the Asgard Range
McMurdo Dry Valleys